Edward John Carlos Plunkett, 20th Baron of Dunsany (born Dublin, 10 September 1939 – died Navan, County Meath, 24 May 2011), with Irish, Brazilian and UK citizenship, was the grandson of the author Lord Dunsany, and a modern artist (painter and sculptor) and landowner. Lord Dunsany succeeded to the title in 1999 on the death of his father, Lt-Col Randal Arthur Henry Plunkett, 19th Baron of Dunsany.

Life

Early life and education
Plunkett was born in Dublin on September 10, 1939, and brought to Brazil for the years of World War II, returning to Ireland at the age of 7, speaking only Brazilian Portuguese. His parents were divorced in 1947, and he was brought up by his grandparents (he was estranged from his father, and his mother lived primarily in Brazil).  Plunkett was educated at Eton College and the Slade School of Fine Art (1957 to 1960), where he showed himself to be a skilled draughtsman.

Career
Plunkett apprenticed with Loio Persio in Rio de Janeiro from 1961 to 1962, and worked and studied gravure with S.W. Hayter in Paris in 1962.  He then attended the Ecole des Beaux-Arts in Paris from 1962 to 1964.  By then an experienced artist in paint and pencil, who later added architectural studies and design work to his skills, Plunkett worked next at Vence in the south of France, where he was the resident painter at the Foundation Karolyi in 1969, then moved to Rome, where he established a studio in Trasteveri. Sometime after a major exhibition in Rome in 1975, he suffered a breakdown in a major partnership and lost much of his art.

Plunkett moved to the USA in 1977, where he developed a studio in Manhattan, New York and took up design as a significant area of work. While in New York, he married and co-founded de Marsillac Plunkett Inc, Designers and Architects, a New York-based partnership for which he provided design elements for his wife's architectural work.

In 1991 Plunkett and his family moved to London, where he kept a studio from 1991 to 1993.  He returned to the family's Dunsany estate near the Hill of Tara in 1994, and set up his main studio in the old Estate Office in the castle. While in Ireland, he did design work for companies working with glass bottles, including mineral water and champagne suppliers.

He was primarily a painter, but also produced sculptures designed by him and manufactured in France or the UK. He painted official portraits of two former Taoisigh (Prime Ministers) of Ireland, Charles Haughey and John Bruton. 

Plunkett was exhibited on multiple occasions, the last public showing being a one-man exhibition in Rome.  His appearances included:
 1968: Mayor Gallery, London
 1969: ICA, London - "Young and Fantastic" (group exhibition)
 1970: Living Irish Artists, Dublin and Belfast (group exhibition)
 1971: ROSC, Galway (group exhibition)
 1972: The Agnew Somerville Gallery, Dublin
 1972: The Graphic Biennale, Krakow (group exhibition)
 1974: Mayor Gallery, London
 1974: Galleria deli'Obelisco, Roma (group exhibition)
 1975: Galleria Il Collezionista d'Arte Contemporarea
 2005: Galleria Candido Portinari, Palazzo Pamphilj, Rome

He was also successful at product design. His last architectural work was the contemporary conversion of an 18th-century wing of Dunsany Castle into a studio and exhibition area. It is called The Plunkett Gallery and it houses Lord Dunsany's paintings, lithographs, drawings, architectural projects, sculptures and designed objects (perfume bottles, Champagne bottles, and numbered editions of vases and dinner services); the gallery is open to visitors by appointment.

Aside from the gallery at Dunsany Castle, Plunkett's work is held by, among others, the Hugh Lane Municipal Gallery in Dublin, the Arts Council of Ireland, the Irish State and its Office of Public Works, the British Board of Works, the National Museum of Poland at Wroclaw and the Centre for Contemporary Art in Toronto, Canada.

Personal life
In 1982, Plunkett married Maria Alice Villela de Carvalho (1942–2020), a descendant of the explorer Vasco Da Gama and of Pedro Álvares Cabral, the founder of Brazil. Plunkett and his wife, Lady Dunsany, an architect qualified in the US, Ireland and the UK, lived at Dunsany Castle, Dunsany, County Meath, Ireland. They had two sons, Randal Plunkett, 21st Baron of Dunsany, and Oliver Plunkett. In addition, he had two stepchildren Daniel and Joana de Marsillac, who were very close to him and considered as his own. Their father was his first cousin and great friend, Jayme de Marsillac.

He died in May 2011, after some years of chronic illness, including having developed cerebral palsy. A private funeral with his widow, sons and step-children, sister, close family friends and staff, was conducted within the ancestral castle. He was buried in the grounds, by the Church of St. Nicholas, the reconsecration of which he had helped arrange for his stepson's marriage. The six pallbearers were his sons and stepson, a family friend and Dunsany curator, and two members of the Castle staff. A memorial service was held in Dunsany Parish Church a week after the funeral.

References

External sources
 Edward Plunkett's website as artist
 Dunsany.net (family website)
 Obituary of Lord Dunsany, The Daily Telegraph, 14 June 2011
  Obituary of Lord Dunsany, The Meath Chronicle, 6 June 2011

1939 births
2011 deaths
Barons of Dunsany
Ernle family
Drax family
Irish people of Brazilian descent
People educated at Eton College
Alumni of the Slade School of Fine Art
École des Beaux-Arts alumni
20th-century Irish painters
21st-century Irish painters
Irish male painters
Irish sculptors
20th-century Irish sculptors
Male sculptors
20th-century Irish male artists